Jairam Hardikar was an Indian actor known for his roles in the Marathi language movies.

Film career
Hardikar's notable movie roles were in the 1979 Marathi political drama movie Sinhasan directed by Jabbar Patel. He also acted in the 1978 Marathi movie "Sarvasakshi" opposite the late Smita Patil.

References

External links
 

Indian male film actors
Male actors in Marathi cinema
1980 deaths